The Doorman (Spanish: El portero), also known as Puerta, joven (Spanish: Door, Young Man or The Door, Please), is a 1950 Mexican comedy film directed by Miguel M. Delgado and starring Cantinflas and Silvia Pinal.

Plot
The portero or doorman of a humble neighborhood (Cantinflas) also writes letters to his neighbors for extra money. He falls in love with his beautiful neighbor, Rosita (Pinal), who cannot walk, while a young military man is also in love with the girl. The doorman wants his neighbor to be happy, so he writes letters to her, but signing as her military admirer. Meanwhile, the doorman has a plan for her to walk again, by earning money at the horse races to pay for her operation.

Cast
Cantinflas as El portero
Silvia Pinal as Rosa María ("Rosita")
Carlos Martínez Baena as Don Sebastián, el profe
Óscar Pulido as Elpidio
Josefina del Mar as La vecina bailarina
Fernando Casanova as Raúl
José Baviera as Dr. Perfecto Lozano
Conchita Gentil Arcos as Doña Cuca, vecina
Pepe Martínez as Profesor examinador
Pitouto as Don Fortino
Ricardo Adalid as Amigo de Raúl en fiesta (uncredited)
Luis Badillo as El turco (uncredited)
Stephen Berne as Masajista (uncredited)
Victorio Blanco as Hombre en velorio (uncredited)
Carmen Cabrera as Miembra del patronato (uncredited)
Jaime Calpe as Estudiante inteligente (uncredited)
Rodolfo Calvo as Hombre en velorio (uncredited)
Flora Alicia Campos as Clienta sirvienta del portero (uncredited)
Lupe Carriles as Vecina chismosa (uncredited)
Enrique Carrillo as El tarzán, vecino pachuco (uncredited)
Mario Castillo as Felipe León Bravo, el diputado (uncredited)
Jorge Chesterking as John, amigo de Perfecto (uncredited)
Felipe de Flores as Amigo de Raúl en fiesta (uncredited)
Lupe del Castillo as Vecina (uncredited)
Edmundo Espino as Esposo de Guadalupe (uncredited)
María Gentil Arcos as Vecina chismosa (uncredited)
Elodia Hernández as Doña Guadalupe (uncredited)
Regino Herrera as Vecino (uncredited)
Rafael Icardo as Secretario (uncredited)
Jaime Jiménez Pons as Estudiante (uncredited)
Paco Martínez as Miembro del patronato (uncredited)
José Luis Moreno as Estudiante (uncredited)
José Pardavé as Lechero (uncredited)
Ismael Pérez as Estudiante (uncredited)
Jorge Pérez as Estudiante (uncredited)
Salvador Quiroz as Empleado de carrera de caballos (uncredited)
Humberto Rodríguez as Empleado de secretaría (uncredited)
Félix Samper as Miembro del patronato barbudo (uncredited)
María Valdealde as Miembra del patronato (uncredited)

Themes and analysis 
John Mraz noted that the film was one of two in which Cantinflas made "disparaging, if humorous remarks" about the pachuco style popularized by fellow comedian Germán Valdés ("Tin-Tan"), the other being If I Were a Congressman. Neufeld, Matthews and Beezley cite the film as an example of comedians imitating and making fun of the same themes, such as macho characters drowning their sorrows in ranchera films.

References

Bibliography

External links

1950 films
1950 comedy films
Mexican comedy films
Films directed by Miguel M. Delgado
Mexican black-and-white films
1950s Mexican films